Natronocella is a genus of bacteria from the family of Ectothiorhodospiraceae with one known species (Natronocella acetinitrilica).

References

Chromatiales
Bacteria genera
Monotypic bacteria genera
Taxa described in 2007